Torpoint Community College (often referred to as 'TCC') is a secondary school in south-east Cornwall, England. It educates 775 students aged 11 to 18. It started life as a 'secondary modern' school before becoming a comprehensive in the 1960s. Traditionally students lived exclusively in the Torpoint and Rame Peninsula, more recently they have been joined by a number of students travelling from Plymouth via the ferry over the River Tamar.

The school's most notable former pupils include Sheryll Murray, Conservative Member of Parliament for South East Cornwall & Jack Stephens (footballer)

TCC's Sixth Form was opened in the late 1990s (prior to which pupils left school at 16 with some continuing their educations elsewhere) and offers a wide range of AS and A Level subjects for post-16 students.

Secondary schools in Cornwall
Foundation schools in Cornwall
Educational institutions established in 1963
1963 establishments in England